Gay Woods (18 September 1948) is an Irish singer. She was one of the original members of Steeleye Span.

Early years

Gabriel Corcoran was born in Dublin, a neighbour of her future husband Terry Woods. Her elder brothers shared Woods' love of hillbilly music and blues. Corcoran and Woods performed together in 1963 at Dublin's Neptune Rowing club and got married in May 1968. Performing as a duo, they sang Carter Family songs and occasionally Irish songs. Terry Woods became a member of Sweeney's Men, who played English and American folk music, plus their own compositions. That summer the band performed at Cambridge Folk Festival. Gay Woods was not in the band. The following summer, the couple went to Keele folk festival where Woods met up with Ashley Hutchings who was then still with Fairport Convention. Terry Woods and Hutchings had an instant rapport.

Steeleye Span, 1969–1970
The first tentative rehearsal for the new band which was to become Steeleye Span was early in November 1969. Johnny Moynihan, the Woods, Andy Irvine and Hutchings met at the Prince of Wales pub in Highgate. Next day Moynihan said he would not be joining Steeleye due to personal differences with Terry Woods. Irvine also dropped out, resuming a solo career prior to meeting Dónal Lunny, with whom he later formed a duo. To replace them, Hutchings invited Bob and Carole Pegg, then the Dransfield brothers, and finally Tim Hart and Maddy Prior, who accepted. Hutchings' departure from Fairport Convention was revealed in NME on 22 November 1969.

Gay Woods felt very neglected at this time, as Hart and Prior were still gigging as a duo, and she was the breadwinner after Sweeney's Men broke up in November. A friend of Terry Woods offered the new band a house in Winterbourne Stoke for rehearsals. Photographs taken that winter in the Wiltshire village appear on some editions of the liner notes of the album Hark! The Village Wait. In March 1970 there was a BBC radio session of the material, and they recorded it in April. The studio time was fraught, with disharmony evident between the two couples. The Woodses went to Nottingham immediately after the recording, and received a phone call a week later to say they had been replaced by Martin Carthy. This rankled so much with Terry that he refused to appear in the grand reunion of Steeleye Span, The Journey, in 1995.

1970–1988
In the summer of 1970 Gay and Terry Woods joined Dr. Strangely Strange.. They gigged in the Netherlands and Germany. The band fell apart shortly afterwards. Terry Woods returned to Ireland to recruit Ed Deane and Pat Nash to his new project, The Woods Band. They recorded their only album in 1971. It was issued with a luxury gatefold embossed with gold Celtic designs. The record label, Greenwich, collapsed after the band had toured with the group Greenslade. The album received good reviews but poor sales. 

Reduced to a duo, they recorded four albums from 1975 to 1978 and a single. The songs are mostly their own compositions, with accompaniment on dulcimer, banjo and acoustic and electric guitars. Gay Woods had one stillbirth, then in 1979 she had a miscarriage. She returned to being a typist. In 1980, Terry and Gay Woods (then on Mulligan Records) approached Garvan Gallagher and Trevor Knight (then of Metropolis) about contributing to a new Woods Band demo. After recording these demo tapes, Gay Woods broke up with Terry Woods and formed a group, Auto Da Fe, with Trevor Knight and three Dutch musicians: Theo Wanders, Carel van Rijn and Wout Pennings. Their sound was New Romantic.. Their singles received strong airplay in Ireland, which guaranteed that their live concerts were profitable. There were eight singles, a compilation and an album, Tatitum. Phil Lynott and Midge Ure did some session work with them.

In 1987, Gay Woods gave birth to a child by Trevor Knight.

Steeleye Span, 1995–2001
In 1994 she was asked to rejoin Steeleye Span, and after recording three albums plus a concert with them, she left them over financial issues.

She later studied for a degree in psychology at the University of Essex.

Discography 
Steeleye Span :
 Hark! The Village Wait (1970)
 Time (1996)
 Horkstow Grange (1998)
 The Journey (live) (1999)
 Bedlam Born (2000)

The Woods Band :
 The Woods Band (1971)

Gay and Terry Woods :
 Backwoods (1975)
 The Time Is Right (1976)
 Renowned (1976)
 Tenderhooks (1978)
 In Concert (1995)
 Lake Songs From Red Water: The Best of Gay & Terry Woods (20-track compilation from their first three albums) (2003)

Auto Da Fé :
 5 Singles & 1 Smoked Cod  (1984) EP
 Tatitum (1985) LP

References

External links
http://www.homestead.com/gaywoods/biography.html 
http://music.yahoo.com/ar-22356940-bio--Gay-Woods 
http://www.huxrecords.com/bio8.htm

1948 births
Living people
British folk rock musicians
Steeleye Span members